Qaleh-ye Farhad Khan (also Romanized as Qal‘eh-ye Farhād Khān; also known as Qal‘eh-ye Farhād Khānād) is a village in Ab Barik Rural District, in the Central District of Sonqor County, Kermanshah Province, Iran. At the 2006 census, its population was 400, in 97 families.

A closely related variant of the Sonqori dialect is spoken in the village.

References 

Populated places in Sonqor County